Joe Weisman & Company or Joe Weisman & Co. was the first department store in Texas.  It opened in the late 19th century in Marshall, Texas.  The building now houses the Weisman Center which is a Retail Cooperative based on an open mall concept.

References

Marshall, Texas